Włocławker Sztyme ('Voice of Włocławek') was a Yiddish language weekly newspaper published from the Polish of Włocławek 1930–1939. It was one of the longest-running Yiddish newspapers in the city. Zyskind Izbicki, A. Lichtensztajn and Israel Mordechai Biderman were editors of the newspaper. The newspaper carried the by-line 'Weekly Paper for Włocławek and surroundings'.

References

1930 establishments in Poland
1939 disestablishments in Poland
Defunct newspapers published in Poland
Defunct weekly newspapers
Weekly newspapers published in Poland
Newspapers established in 1930
Publications disestablished in 1939
Yiddish newspapers
Yiddish-language mass media in Poland